Sewak may refer to:

 Sewak (name), an Indian name (including a list of people with the name)
 Sewak (film), a 1975 Bollywood film
 Miswak, or sewak, a teeth-cleaning twig

See also